Nucella, common name dog whelks or dog winkles, is a genus of small to medium-sized predatory sea snails, marine gastropod mollusks in the subfamily Ocenebrinae which is part of the large family Muricidae, the murex snails or rock snails.

Species
Species in the genus Nucella include:
 Nucella analoga (Forbes, 1852)
 Nucella angustior Houart, Vermeij & Wiedrick, 2019
 † Nucella bermejensis Lozano-Francisco & Vera-Peláez, 2006 
 Nucella canaliculata  (Duclos, 1832) - channeled dogwinkle
Nucella dubia (Krauss, 1848)
 Nucella emarginata (Deshayes, 1839) - emarginate dogwinkle
Nucella freycinetii (Deshayes, 1839)
Nucella fuscata (Forbes, 1850)
Nucella heyseana (Dunker, 1882)
 Nucella lamellosa (Gmelin, 1791) - frilled dogwinkle
 Nucella lapillus (Linnaeus, 1758) - Atlantic dogwinkle, dog whelk
 Nucella lima (Gmelin, 1791) - file dogwinkle
Nucella ostrina (Gould, 1852)
Nucella rolani (Bogi & Nofroni, 1984)
Nucella squamosa (Lamarck, 1816)
 Nucella wahlbergi (Krauss, 1848)
 Species brought into synonymy 
Nucella acuminata Carcelles, 1954 accepted as Acanthina unicornis (Bruguière, 1789)
 Nucella castanea (Küster, 1886): synonym of Orania castanea (Küster, 1886)
Nucella cingulata  (Linnaeus, 1771): synonym of Trochia cingulata (Linnaeus, 1771)
 Nucella elongata Golikov & Kussakin, 1962: synonym of  Nucella freycinetii (Deshayes, 1839)
 Nucella heyseana var. elongata Golikov & Kussakin, 1962: synonym of Nucella heyseana (Dunker, 1882)
 Nucella lindaniae Lorenz, 1991: synonym of  Nucella wahlbergi (Krauss, 1848)
 Nucella pyramidalis (Turton, 1932): synonym of Nucella dubia (Krauss, 1848)
 Nucella theobroma Roding, 1798: synonym of  Nucella lapillus (Linnaeus, 1758)

References

 Stewart, R. B. (1927). Gabb's California fossil type gastropods. Proceedings of the Academy of Natural Sciences of Philadelphia. 78: 287–447, pls. 20–32.
 Vaught, K.C. (1989). A classification of the living Mollusca. American Malacologists: Melbourne, FL (USA). . XII, 195 pp.
 Gofas, S.; Le Renard, J.; Bouchet, P. (2001). Mollusca, in: Costello, M.J. et al. (Ed.) (2001). European register of marine species: a check-list of the marine species in Europe and a bibliography of guides to their identification. Collection Patrimoines Naturels, 50: pp. 180–213
 Marko P. B. 2004. ‘What's larvae got to do with it?' Disparate patterns of post-glacial population structure in two benthic marine gastropods with identical dispersal potential. Molecular Ecology, 13: 597–611
 Chichvarkhin A.Y. & Chichvarkhina O.V. (2014). Systematics of the western Pacific "giant" dog-whelks referred to Nucella elongata, Nucella heyseana, and Nucella lamellosa (Muricidae, Gastropoda). Mollusks of the eastern Asia and adjacent seas, Abstracts of the conference, Vladivostok, 6-8 October 2014. 11-12

External links
 Röding, P.F. (1798). Museum Boltenianum sive Catalogus cimeliorum e tribus regnis naturæ quæ olim collegerat Joa. Fried Bolten, M. D. p. d. per XL. annos proto physicus Hamburgensis. Pars secunda continens Conchylia sive Testacea univalvia, bivalvia & multivalvia. Trapp, Hamburg. viii, 199 pp. 
 Kool S.P. & Boss K.J. (1992). Nucella Röding, 1798 (Gastropoda: Muricidae): type species. The Nautilus. 106(1): 21-23
 Kool S.P. 1993. The Systematic position of the genus Nucella.(Prosobranchia: Muricidae: Ocenebrinae). The Nautilus, 107(2): 43-57
  Barco, A.; Herbert, G.; Houart, R.; Fassio, G. & Oliverio, M. (2017). A molecular phylogenetic framework for the subfamily Ocenebrinae (Gastropoda, Muricidae). Zoologica Scripta. 46 (3): 322-335.

 

Ocenebrinae
Gastropod genera